P130 may refer to:

 Nucleolar phosphoprotein p130
 Pottier P.130 Coccinelle, a French light aircraft
 Retinoblastoma-like protein 2
 , a patrol boat of the Turkish Navy
 P130, a state regional road in Latvia